The Nissan Pathfinder is a range of sport utility vehicles manufactured by Nissan since 1985. Until the third-generation model, the Pathfinder is based on Nissan's compact pickup truck platform which it shares with the Navara/Frontier. The front end of the D21 (first generation) and R51 (third generation) Pathfinder is notably identical with the Navara/Frontier up until the B-pillars.

The Pathfinder was marketed as the  outside North America. Beginning in 2004, the R51 series was marketed internationally as the Pathfinder.

In 2012, the R52 series Pathfinder was released as a three-row crossover SUV based on the  unibody Nissan D platform, moving away from the body-on-frame chassis format. The role of body-on-frame SUV in Nissan's global lineup was passed to the Terra/X-Terra, which was released in 2018 and based on the D23 series Navara.

First generation (YD21/WD21; 1985) 

The first generation Pathfinder was introduced in 1985 as a two-door body-on-frame SUV, sharing styling and most components with the Nissan Hardbody Truck. Built on a ladder-type frame, the Pathfinder was Nissan's response to the Chevrolet Blazer, Ford Bronco II, Jeep Cherokee, and non-American SUVs like the Toyota 4Runner, Honda Passport, and the Isuzu MU.

Before the Pathfinder there was the Nissan Bushmaster (an aftermarket conversion of the Datsun Truck). Its optional 4WD system that could be engaged electronically while the vehicle was moving was unique at the time. All YD21 Pathfinders were available in both 2WD and manually engaged 4WD configurations, with base models installed with a 2.4 L four-cylinder engine. In certain countries, this generation also came with a 2.7 L I4 diesel engine known as the TD27 with the option of a turbocharger installed later in November 1988.

In Japan, it was exclusive to Nissan Bluebird Shop locations, where it was called the Terrano and served as a smaller companion to the larger Nissan Safari. While the Pathfinder/Terrano was essentially based on the newly introduced Hardbody truck, the rear five-link coil suspension was borrowed from the Safari to enhance its off-road abilities. In addition to the Station Wagon version (two or late four doors), the home market also received a version intended for commercial use called the "Estate Van" (chassis codes beginning with the letter "V"). The two-door version was available with the Nissan VG30i V6, which produces  at 4800 rpm in Japanese market specifications.

As the Japanese market Terrano was regarded as a luxury vehicle, with an emphasis on outdoor leisure activities, the Terrano was introduced to Japanese buyers as an off-road, back-country Fairlady ZX. To emphasize this marketing approach, the Terrano was available with options not normally found on other budget-minded vehicles. Some of the upmarket Japanese-model options were climate-controlled air conditioning, electrically powered windows, seats, door locks, and, in 1993, Recaro seats. Nissan's sports division Autech added special equipment packages, introducing the "Wide R3M Urban" and the "AJ Limited". The "Wide" models used overfenders and larger bumpers which made their exterior dimensions exceed dimension regulations, thus incurring a higher annual road tax obligation. The Wide models were given the leading letter "L" in their model codes. The emphasis on luxury was partly due to a strong economy in Japan, in what is now regarded as the Japanese "bubble economy".

In 1985, the first generation Terrano was entered in the ninth Paris to Dakar rally race, with continued entries in rally races for many years, winning multiple times in its category.

The four-door Pathfinder was introduced in October 1989 to enhance the Pathfinder's market appeal, but the wheelbase and overall vehicle length were not extended to accommodate the rear doors. At its introduction to North America, 1985 to 1989 Pathfinders came with a two-door body. In early 1985 it became four door-only. Some US 1985 Pathfinders came with the two door body, but they are rare.

When the four door version was introduced, Nissan chose to conceal the door handles as a part of the "C" pillar trim to make it appear like a two-door truck with a camper shell, with the conventional door handles on the front doors. This design tradition was used on all Nissan SUVs, including the Nissan Armada, Nissan Juke, Nissan Terrano II, and the Nissan Xterra. The front doors were slightly shortened to accommodate the rear doors.

From 1985 to 1989 Pathfinders were available with either the Nissan VG30i 3.0 L V6 (torque), or the Nissan Z24i 2.4 L I4 (the same engine choices as the Nissan Hardbody Truck). In 1990, the V6 received an upgrade from throttle body injection to a multi point fuel injection system. Also in 1990, the Z24i was replaced with the KA24E. The first generation continued until 1995.

The first generation Nissan Pathfinder also sold in Indonesia from 1995 to 2006 as Nissan Terrano. Only available with four-door body, 2389cc Z24 carburetted petrol engine (103 hp & 182Nm), 2WD (4WD only available for 1995-1996 highest trim model) and 5-speed manual transmission. Only 17,801 units were sold during 11 years of production.

Facelifts 
A facelift occurred in 1990 when the 4-door model was introduced. The front grille was revised, numerous interior trim level options became available and numerous exterior packages were offered by dealerships. The 1993 models received a third brake light and the 1994 models received a curved dashboard. Two more facelifts occurred for Indonesian production Terrano in 1997 and 2003.

Second generation (R50; 1995) 

The second generation Pathfinder was introduced in late 1995 with revised styling. For the 1999 model year, the Pathfinder was freshened. In 2000, model year 2001 brought a new  V6 engine (for the automatic transmission models). The manual transmission models boasted  and 240-lbft of torque. This engine was the VQ35DE. The 4-cylinder engine option was no longer available.

Diesel engines continued to be used in Japanese and European models.

As of the 2002 model year, the Terrano / Pathfinder was no longer marketed in Japan, and was available in North America, Europe and the Middle East. The market position held by the Terrano in Japan was replaced by the Nissan Murano in 2002. The Japanese market Terrano and high luxury content Terrano Regulus saw demand drop significantly due to the hard economic times felt in Japan, known as the Lost Decade. Nissan offered a smaller, off-road vehicle to its Japanese customer base who enjoyed the Pathfinder when it introduced the Nissan X-Trail in 2000.

Facelifts 
The Pathfinder received a facelift for the 1999.5 model year with a revised front fascia, rear fascia, and interior — followed by another facelift occurred in 2002, receiving the updated Nissan logo, a revised grille, as well as a new steering wheel, different rims and radio display. In 2003, the Pathfinder again received a new steering wheel.

Infiniti QX4/Terrano Regulus 

The Infiniti QX4 is a mid-size luxury SUV introduced in September 1996 and based on the Nissan Pathfinder. It was released following Acura's introduction of the SLX and Lexus's larger LX 450. The QX4 was Infiniti's first entry into the SUV market segment.

Marketed in Japan as the Nissan Terrano Regulus and available in Nissan's JDM Nissan Bluebird Store, the Terrano Regulus was also briefly offered at Nissan Motor Store, its luxury-oriented dealership. Major differences between these vehicles and the Pathfinder include a more upscale interior, and unique styling.

Year-to-year changes 

The QX4 received its first major update in 2000 for model year 2001, with a new VQ series engine (also later seen in the G35 and FX35) increasing its power from a relatively low  to a  V6 engine. The displacement went from 3.3 L to 3.5 L. The timing belt was replaced with a timing chain and the ignition distributor was replaced with an individual coil ignition system.

This facelift also gave the QX4 an updated exterior and interior body style, including a new dash with integrated analog clock,  alloy wheels and xenon HID headlamps. In Japan, the Terrano Regulus trim package was no longer offered. Also, a rear-wheel drive QX4 model was added (1997 through 2000 were only available in 4WD).

2002 Infiniti QX: Cruise control designed to maintain a set distance from other traffic was the main addition for 2002. The QX4 shared Nissan's Intelligent Cruise Control with Infiniti's flagship Q45 sedan. Employing laser sensors, the system was designed to automatically speed or slow the QX4 to keep it a constant distance from cars ahead. Also new for 2002 was a revised audio system, plus audio controls for the available leather/wood steering wheel. The optional rear-seat video entertainment system offered a choice of VCR or DVD player.

2003 Infiniti QX: Additional standard equipment for 2003 included curtain-type side airbags, available for the first time. New standard equipment that had previously been part of the Premium Package included 17-inch wheels, a driver-seat memory system, and a leather/woodgrain steering wheel with audio controls. Options included heated front/rear seats and a videotape or DVD rear-seat entertainment system. A power moonroof that came standard.

The QX4 was discontinued in 2003, and its position in price was taken by the FX35/45 crossover SUV. The last QX4 was manufactured during November 2002.  The QX4 was succeeded by the larger QX56 in 2004.

Third generation (R51; 2004) 

In August 2003, Nissan unveiled Dunehawk Concept and showcased it at the IAA 2003 in Frankfurt (R51 design patents filed 8 September 2003), previewing the next Pathfinder's design. At the 2004 North American International Auto Show, Nissan unveiled a completely redesigned Pathfinder for the 2005 model year. The new R51 Pathfinder uses the Nissan F-Alpha platform. It is powered by a 4.0 L V6 engine VQ40DE or a 2.5 L YD25DDT turbodiesel.

The larger Pathfinder Armada debuted in late 2004, but was based on the Titan full-sized pickup truck and dropped the "Pathfinder" prefix in 2005.

The 2005 model introduced a third row of seats to the Pathfinder line for the first time.

2008 facelift (US and Middle East) 
The facelifted 2008 Pathfinder debuted at the 2007 Chicago Auto Show.

2010 facelift (Europe, South America, Asia/Oceania, Caribbean) 
Over the combined cycle manual versions use 8.4 L/100 km – an improvement of 1.4 L/100 km – while  emissions have fallen by 40g/km to 224 g/km. Both figures were class competitive at the time. A version of the engine with a diesel particulate filter (DPF) was also available in certain markets.

The R51 series Pathfinder continues to be sold and produced outside North America.

Exterior changes 
The revised models have been given a new look front and rear to differentiate them from their predecessors. Changes at the front include a new bonnet, revised grille and a new bumper assembly. Adding 80 mm to the length of both models, the bumper is more rounded and lends a more sporting touch to the cars.

A new headlamp design with projectors is offered for Xenon lamps. Headlamps washers now pop up from beneath body color moulding in the bumpers. A new  alloy wheel complements the existing range of 16-inch (steel and alloy) and 17-inch (alloy) designs. V8 models are given a discreet V8 badge at the leading edge of both front doors and a new side moulding across the doors.

Fourth generation (R52; 2012) 

A redesigned Pathfinder went on sale in late October 2012 as a 2013 model. It moved away from a body-on-frame, truck-based SUV and adopted a unibody design. It rides on the same platform as the Infiniti QX60, Altima, Maxima, Murano and Quest. This generation Pathfinder has an interior similar to the second generation Murano, the Infiniti QX60, and some more SUVs and sedans. The third row has more leg room than the Nissan Rogue.

A concept, nearly identical to the eventual production model, was first revealed at the 2012 North American International Auto Show. Retail availability was scheduled for September 2012. City, highway and combined average fuel economy numbers are 20 (City), 26 (Highway) and 22 (Combined) mpg for the FWD version and 19 (City), 25 (Highway) and 21 (Combined) mpg for the 4WD version. The Pathfinder is now significantly lighter than the previous generation, with the FWD model weighing 4149 pounds, while the 4WD Pathfinder weighs 4290 pounds.

This generation also abandons having the rear door handles hidden on the C pillar, a design feature of the first three generations of Pathfinders. As of 2015, the R52 series is only available in North America, Africa, Australia, New Zealand, South Korea, and the Middle East. It is not produced or sold in Japan.

2014 model year update 
Changes to the US 2014 model include:
 New SL Tech Package, featuring Bose Premium Audio System, Nissan Navigation System, voice recognition, XM NavTraffic and NavWeather capability (SiriusXM subscription required, sold separately), Zagat Restaurant Survey, Bluetooth Streaming Audio and 8.0-inch color touchscreen monitor
 Offered in four models: S, SV, SL and Platinum (each available in 4WD and 2WD); Pathfinder Hybrid offered in SV, SL and Platinum (4WD and 2WD)
 3.5-liter V6 models available late summer 2013
 Pathfinder Hybrid available fall 2013
 Pathfinder utilizes a Continuously Variable Transmission (CVT) transmission made by Jatco; early versions of this CVT have proved to be problematic to the point of requiring replacement by Nissan in some 2013 and 2014 model years due to a hydraulic line size issue.

Canadian models of 2014 Pathfinder includes Pathfinder 3.5-litre 4WD V6 X, Pathfinder V6 S; 2014 Pathfinder Hybrid includes SV and Platinum Premium.

A locally built Pathfinder entered the Russian market in November 2014.

Pathfinder Hybrid 
Introduced for model year 2014, the Pathfinder Hybrid, available in two-wheel drive and four-wheel drive configurations, uses a supercharged 2.5-liter four-cylinder gasoline engine and an electric motor paired to a compact lithium-ion battery. The Li-ion battery fits under the third row seat, with no effect on space used for cargo or passengers. The Pathfinder Hybrid also has hybrid emblems and hybrid LED taillights versus the non-hybrid model.

Nissan discontinued the Pathfinder Hybrid after the 2014 model year due to owner reviews and complaints that they could not get gas milage that was anywhere close to the advertised 25 to 28 mpg and limited availability and poor sales in the United States (discontinued after the 2015 model year in Canada and in other global markets except Australia and New Zealand).

2017 facelift 
The headlights had LED projector low beam headlamps and LED daytime running lights standard on Platinum trim levels, while S, SV and SL trim levels offer restyled halogen projector headlights with LED daytime running lights. Restyled tail lights will be standard on Platinum trim levels, and all 2017 Pathfinders will also have new exterior colors added. The interior also has redesigned cup holders. A Motion Activated Liftgate is also now standard on SL and Platinum trim levels only as part of the power liftgate. The 2017 model year is also its 30th anniversary for the Nissan Pathfinder but there won't be any 30th anniversary special edition model for the 2017 Pathfinder. But the Nissan Pathfinder will have a Midnight Edition trim level which will be higher than the Platinum trim level for its base MSRP and arrive in early 2017 and the Nissan Altima, Sentra, Murano, Maxima and Rogue will also add the Midnight Edition trim level to their trim lineups in early 2017.

2019 update 
The Rock Creek Edition package is introduced to the Nissan Pathfinder for the 2019 model year. The appearance package is only available on the SV and SL trim levels. The package adds 18" X 7.5" dark-finished aluminum alloy wheels, black overfenders and black door handles, Rock Creek Edition badging, leatherette-appointed seating with cloth inserts and Rock Creek Edition badging (SV trim level), leather appointed seating with Rock Creek Edition badging (SL trim level), and premium Rock Creek Edition interior trim.

Fifth generation (R53; 2021) 

The fifth-generation Pathfinder was unveiled on 4 February 2021, scheduled for a summer 2021 debut as a 2022 model while the 2021 model year was entirely skipped. The model remains a unibody crossover, riding on the same platform as the previous generation, though it gains a more squared-off look with styling cues from previous Pathfinders along with the Rogue and Armada. Its dimensions are  longer,  wider, and  taller. The fifth-generation Pathfinder also receives a new terrain-management system, dubbed Intelligent 4x4, featuring 7 management settings. Trailer sway control is also included as standard, in addition to Safety Shield 360, Nissan's active safety suite.

The interior also receives a redesign, featuring a squared-off, trucklike appearance mirroring the overall theme set by the exterior. The new interior also gains the "floating bridge" and electronic shifter seen in the smaller Rogue. An 8-inch touchscreen infotainment with Apple CarPlay and Android Auto is standard, while upper trims use a 9.0-inch unit, with wireless Apple CarPlay capability. The top-spec Platinum model gains a 12.3-inch digital gauge cluster and a 10.8-inch heads-up display in addition to the 9.0-inch screen. The fifth-generation Pathfinder comes standard as an 8-seater, with second-row bucket seats, a first for the Pathfinder, are now on offer. The S and SV trim levels get cloth seat trim as standard, with leather-appointed seating standard on the SL trim level; the Platinum trim level gets quilted, semi-aniline leather-appointed seating.

In 2022, for the 2023 model year, the new Rock Creek Edition is available with black tires, and off-road suspension and a new Baja Storm exterior color is also available and the wireless smartphone charging pad is now standard on the SL grade while the Platinum trim level comes standard with second-row bucket seats.

Sales

References

External links 

 (US)

Pathfinder
Cars introduced in 1985
1990s cars
2000s cars
2010s cars
2020s cars
Rear-wheel-drive vehicles
Front-wheel-drive vehicles
All-wheel-drive vehicles
Compact sport utility vehicles
Mid-size sport utility vehicles
Crossover sport utility vehicles
Hybrid electric vehicles
Vehicles with CVT transmission
Motor vehicles manufactured in the United States